Nealcidion spinosum is a species of beetle in the family Cerambycidae. It was described by Monné and Delfino in 1986.

References

Nealcidion
Beetles described in 1986